Isla de Menorca is a Spanish geographical indication for Vino de la Tierra wines located in the autonomous region of the Balearic Islands, Spain. Vino de la Tierra is one step below the mainstream Denominación de Origen indication on the Spanish wine quality ladder.

The area covered by this geographical indication comprises all the municipalities of the island of Menorca. There are currently around 20 hectares of vineyards and 5 wineries (bodegas) registered with the Regulatory Council (Consejo Regulador).

It acquired its Vino de la Tierra status in 2002.

Grape varieties
 Red: Cabernet sauvignon, Merlot, Monastrell, Tempranillo and Syrah
 White: Chardonnay, Macabeo, Malvasia, Moscatel, Parellada and Moll

References

External links
 Wines of Menorca. Discovering Menorca
 Vi de la terra de Menorca
 Vinologue Menorca

Spanish wine
Wine regions of Spain
Appellations
Culture of Menorca